Tetreuaresta guttata is a species of tephritid or fruit flies in the genus Tetreuaresta of the family Tephritidae.

Distribution
This species is found in Brazil.

References

Tephritinae
Insects described in 1846
Diptera of South America